Renata Limited (formerly Pfizer Laboratories (Bangladesh) Limited), also known as Renata, is one of the top ten (in terms of revenue) pharmaceutical manufacturers in Bangladesh. Renata is engaged in the manufacture and marketing of human pharmaceutical and animal health products. The company also manufactures animal therapeutics and nutrition products.  Renata currently employs about 2300 people in its head office in Mirpur, Dhaka and its two production facilities in Mirpur, Dhaka and Rajendrapur, Dhaka.

Financial data
Renata is a publicly traded company on the Dhaka Stock Exchange (ticker: RENATA).

Production facilities
Recently, Renata Limited has received the UK MHRA approval for its Potent Product Facility. This facility currently manufactures hormone, steroid and cytotoxic drugs, and is exporting prednisolone to the UK.

The company also operates four other manufacturing units – the original Pfizer facility for general products, a UNICEF-approved SFF (Sachet Filling Facility).

Partnerships
Recently, GAIN (The Global Alliance for Improved Nutrition) provided US$2.9 million to Renata Limited and BRAC, one of the biggest NGOs in the developing world, to build and operate an innovative business model to produce and deliver multi-nutrient powders to vulnerable infants in Bangladesh.

Constroversy 
Renata was fined on 21 January 2016 by the Department of Environment for damaging the environment. The company has also illegally occupied land owned by the forest department. Syed S. Kaiser Kabir, the CEO, of the company had illegally grabbed government land to build a house near Dhaka-Mymensingh highway.

References

External links
 Renata Limited Official Website
 Renata's profile with contact info on Pharma Mirror Magazine
 GAIN Official Website
 Renata Limited job circular 2020
 Video on GAIN and Renata's Partnership on Solving Malnutrition in Bangladesh
 Bangladesh Associate of Pharmaceutical Industries Official Website

Pharmaceutical companies of Bangladesh
Pharmaceutical companies established in 1993
Bangladeshi brands